The Mac Muse is a Czech single-place paraglider that was designed by Peter Recek and produced by Mac Para Technology of Rožnov pod Radhoštěm. It remained in production in 2016 as the Muse 4.

Design and development
The aircraft was designed as an intermediate glider and paramotoring wing.

The design has progressed through four generations of models, the Muse, Muse 2, 3 and 4, each improving on the last. The models are each named for their approximate wing area in square metres.

The manufacturer claims a glide ratio of 9:1 for the Muse 4.

Variants

Muse
Muse 23
Extra small-sized model for lighter pilots. The glider model is DHV 1 certified.
Muse 25
Small-sized model for light pilots. The glider model is IA certified.
Muse 28
Mid-sized model for medium-weight pilots. The glider model is DHV 1 certified.
Muse 30
Large-sized model for heavier pilots. The glider model is IA certified.
Muse 33
Extra large-sized model for even heavier pilots.

Muse 4
Muse 4 22
Extra small-sized model for lighter pilots. The glider model is LTF/EN-A certified.
Muse 4 24
Small-sized model for light pilots. The glider model is LTF/EN-A certified.
Muse 4 26
Mid-sized model for medium-weight pilots. The glider model is LTF/EN-A certified.
Muse 4 28
Large-sized model for heavier pilots. The glider model is LTF/EN-A certified.
Muse 4 30
Extra large-sized model for even heavier pilots. The glider model is LTF/EN-A certified.
Muse 4 34
Extra large-sized model for even heavier pilots.

Specifications (Muse 23)

References

External links

Muse
Paragliders